Erhard Scheibe (24 September 1927 – 7 January 2010) was a German philosopher of science. His works discuss the philosophy of physics and the interpretations of quantum mechanics. He was professor at the University of Heidelberg.

Bibliography 

 The logical analysis of quantum mechanics, Pergamon, New York, 1973. 

 Die Philosophie der Physiker, Verlag C. H. Beck, Munich, 2006.

References 

1927 births
2010 deaths
German philosophers
Academic staff of Heidelberg University